Cologne is a city in Carver County, Minnesota, United States. The population was 1,519 at the 2010 census. The city was at a population of about 1,981 people at the 2020 United States Census. The city is approximately 30 miles from Minneapolis.

Geography

Infrastructure

Transportation
U.S. Highway 212 and Minnesota State Highway 284 are two of the main routes in Cologne.

History
Cologne was platted in 1880, and incorporated in 1881. The community was named for Cologne, Germany.

In 1939, the town of Cologne was preserved on film in the amateur short subject Cologne: From the Diary of Ray and Esther, which chronicles aspects of life in the German-American community prior to the American engagement in World War II. The film was named to the National Film Registry in 2001, and is one of only a half-dozen amateur works to be included on the list.

In March 2015 the city of Cologne, Minnesota hired Jesse Dickson as their city administrator.

In November 2016 Matt Lein was elected Mayor.

Demographics

2010 census
As of the census of 2010, there were 1,519 people, 539 households, and 398 families living in the city. The racial makeup of the city was 94.9% White, 0.9% African American, 1.2% Asian, 1.4% from other races, and 1.6% from two or more races. Hispanic or Latino of any race were 3.2% of the population.

There were 539 households, of which 45.3% had children under the age of 18 living with them, 63.8% were married couples living together, 5.0% had a female householder with no husband present, 5.0% had a male householder with no wife present, and 26.2% were non-families. 19.1% of all households were made up of individuals, and 4.6% had someone living alone who was 65 years of age or older. The average household size was 2.82 and the average family size was 3.29.

The median age in the city was 32 years. 32.1% of residents were under the age of 18; 5.9% were between the ages of 18 and 24; 37.2% were from 25 to 44; 18.5% were from 45 to 64; and 6.3% were 65 years of age or older. The gender makeup of the city was 52.1% male and 47.9% female.

2000 census
As of the census of 2000, there were 1,012 people, 385 households, and 279 families living in the city. The racial makeup of the city was 97.43% White, 1.48% Asian, 0.49% from other races, and 0.59% from two or more races. Hispanic or Latino of any race were 1.48% of the population.

There were 385 households, out of which 38.2% had children under the age of 18 living with them, 61.8% were married couples living together, 6.5% had a female householder with no husband present, and 27.5% were non-families. 20.3% of all households were made up of individuals, and 8.1% had someone living alone who was 65 years of age or older.  The average household size was 2.63 and the average family size was 3.06.

In the city, the population was spread out, with 28.4% under the age of 18, 7.4% from 18 to 24, 41.2% from 25 to 44, 14.7% from 45 to 64, and 8.3% who were 65 years of age or older.  The median age was 31 years. For every 100 females, there were 110.0 males.  For every 100 females age 18 and over, there were 106.6 males.

The median income for a household in the city was $54,583, and the median income for a family was $61,471. Males had a median income of $40,034 versus $28,382 for females. The per capita income for the city was $20,955.  About 0.7% of families and 1.9% of the population were below the poverty line, including none of those under age 18 and 2.5% of those age 65 or over.

Politics

Matt Lein is the mayor of Cologne

Arts and culture

Museums and other points of interest
Cologne has several buildings listed on the National Register of Historic Places.

Parks and recreation
There are six parks located in Cologne, including Marion Field, Meadow Park, VFW Park, Lions Park, Fritz Field and Village Park.

References

External links

 The City of Cologne Minnesota Website

Cities in Carver County, Minnesota
Cities in Minnesota